Phrissolaus inspersus is a species of beetle in the family Cerambycidae, the only species in the genus Phrissolaus.

References

Acanthocinini